In My Eyes is the second album released by soul/freestyle/dance musician Stevie B.  This album featured Stevie's first top 40 pop hit, with the lead-off track "I Wanna Be the One" reaching #32.  The next single, the title track "In My Eyes" followed its predecessor into the top 40, while the third single, "Girl I Am Searching for You" also became a moderate hit.  However, the fourth single released, "Love Me for Life" became the most successful track from the album, peaking at #29 on the pop charts.

Track listing (LMR Records & BCM Records)
All songs written by Stevie B., except where noted.
 "I Wanna Be the One" – 5:02
 "Girl I Am Searching for You" – 4:44
 "I Came To Rock Your Body" – 5:02
 "Love Me for Life" – 5:19 (Stevie B, Dadgel Atabay)
 "In My Eyes" – 5:17
 "Lifetime Love Affair" – 4:14 (B., Glenn Gutierrez)
 "Come With Me" – 4:44
 "Children Of Tomorrow" – 4:44

Bonus tracks

Certifications

Charts

Year-end position

Personnel
Stevie B.: Keyboards, Drum & Computer Programming, All Vocals
Glenn Gutierrez: Computer Programming

Production
Executive Producer: Herb Moelis
Arranged by Stevie B., Dadgel Atabay & Glenn Gutierrez
All songs recorded and mixed by Stevie B. & Jimmy Starr, except "Girl I Am Searching for You", "I Came To Rock your Body" and "Children of Tomorrow", which were recorded and mixed by Stevie B. & Tolga Katas
Mastered by Herb Powers
All songs published by MyaT Music/Saja Music Publishing.

References

1989 albums
Stevie B albums